Dražen "Žera" Žerić (born 20 July 1964) is a Bosnian singer and one of the founders and lead vocalist of  famous Bosnian band, Crvena Jabuka (Red Apple).

Noted for his spiky hair and a distinctive voice, he remains one of the most recognizable vocals of the entire area of Former Yugoslavia.

Biography

Early years 

Žerić was born in the city of Mostar, SR Bosnia and Herzegovina, SFR Yugoslavia in a family of Bosniaks professors Nedžib and Šemsa. Žerić has one brother, Damir, who lives in Rome.

Žerić grew up in Sarajevo where he attended music school for piano, as well as primary and secondary school. He later graduated with aa economics degree from The University of Sarajevo.

From early to mid 1985, Zlatko Arslanagić formed a band with his mates Dražen Ričl, Aljoša Buha, Cunja Jelčić and Žera. That was the beginning of Crvena jabuka.

Crvena jabuka quickly became one of the most successful bands in Yugoslavia topping charts year after year, from 1985 to 1990. In 1986, on their way to a concert in Mostar, 3 band members Dražen- Zijo, Aljoša and Zlatko- Zlaja had a terrible car accident near Jablaničko lake in which Aljoša Buha died on impact while lead singer Drazen Ričl died in October 1986 from his injuries. A year passed after the accident and fans were expecting them to continue with Ričl's music. Žera and Zlaja had some songs that Ričl wrote and composed so they named Žera, who was a keyboard player at the time before the accident, the lead singer.
After some time Žera became recognized as one of the biggest teenage idols along with Bajaga and Boris Novković.

The band's so called Yugoslav years ended in 1990 by winning the prestige Messam music award in Belgrade which crowned their most successful album Tamo gdje ljubav počinje (There, where love begins).

War and post-war 

In 1992 as the Yugoslav War advanced into Sarajevo, the entire Yugoslavian music scene toppled. Žera spent two years under the Serbian siege of Sarajevo doing humanitarian work and charity concerts along with singers Kemal Monteno, Mladen Vojičić Tifa and Zlatan Fazlić-Fazla.

By the end of 1994 Žera moved to Zagreb, Croatia. He was quickly granted Croatian citizenship and, in the early 1995, he signed a contract with Croatian music label Tutico, reuniting Crvena Jabuka along with their original drummer, Darko Jelčić-Cunja.

A comeback album U tvojim očima was released in the spring of 1996 and it was a huge success. Since then, the band released eleven studio albums and one concert album selling more than 500 thousand copies worldwide which made them the best selling band of all times from former Yugoslavia, ahead of the most famous Yugoslav band ever, Bijelo dugme.

Constant touring took toll on Žera's health. His extensive drinking habits had been reported many times. In 1998 he was pulled over by the Croatian police on the Croatian-Slovenian border and later detained reportedly for not appearing at the Municipal Court in Zagreb where he was due for the trial in the court case in which he was accused of driving under the influence of alcohol.
The case was later dismissed and Žera was given probation.

Žera lives in Zagreb, Croatia. He got married in 2008 and has two children.

References

External links
 

1964 births
Living people
Musicians from Mostar
Bosniaks of Bosnia and Herzegovina
Bosnia and Herzegovina rock musicians
Bosnia and Herzegovina rock singers
Naturalized citizens of Croatia
Bosniaks of Croatia
Croatian rock musicians
Croatian rock singers